The file xorg.conf is a file used for configuring the X.Org Server.

For a long time, editing xorg.conf was necessary for advanced input devices and multiple monitor output to work correctly. In modern systems this is seldom necessary due to input hotplugging and the XRandR extension integrated into new X.org releases. Some devices still require manual editing, notably components utilizing proprietary drivers may require explicit configuration, in order for Xorg to load them.

See also

 XF86Config
 XFree86 Modeline

External links
 Xorg.conf manual page

References

Configuration files
X Window System